Vavasour is the surname of:

Vavasour (family), an English Catholic family dating back to Norman times
Anne Vavasour (c. 1560–c. 1650), Maid of Honour to Queen Elizabeth I, and  mistress of Edward de Vere, 17th Earl of Oxford
Thomas Vavasour (about 1536/7–1585), physician and recusant of the reign of Queen Elizabeth I
Thomas Vavasour (knight marshal) (1560–1620), Knight Marshal to King James I
John Vavasour (c. 1440–1506), English judge
Sir Henry Vavasour, benefactor of All Saints' Church, Barwick-in-Elmet, Leeds
Mervin Vavasour (1821–1866), officer of the British Army Royal Engineers
William Vavasour (1514–1566), English Member of Parliament and High Sheriff of Yorkshire

See also
Vavasseur